Abacetus kivuanus is a species of ground beetle in the subfamily Pterostichinae. It was described by Straneo in 1944.

References

kivuanus
Beetles described in 1944